Bronisław Prugar-Ketling (2 July 1891, Trześniów, Subcarpathian Voivodeship – 18 February 1948, Warsaw) was a Polish general.

He was a member of Polish Military Organisation in World War I, later served in the Blue Army. He fought in the Polish-Soviet War. 

During German invasion of Poland he commanded the Polish 11th Infantry Division in Karpaty Army. Under his command the 11th I.D. defeated the mechanized groups of the SS "Germania" Regiment in the Battle of Jaworów.

In Sikorski's Army (Polish Army in France), commanded the Second Infantry Fusiliers Division. After the fall of France, he was interned in Switzerland. Returned to Poland and reenlisted in the People's Army of Poland.

Honours and awards
Gold Cross of the Virtuti Militari, previously awarded the Silver Cross (1921)
Commander's Cross of the Order of Polonia Restituta, previously awarded the Officer's Cross
Order of the Cross of Grunwald, Third Class
Cross of Independence
Cross of Valour - twice
Gold Cross of Merit

1891 births
1948 deaths
People from Brzozów County
Polish Austro-Hungarians
Polish generals
Polish Military Organisation members
Blue Army (Poland) personnel
Recipients of the Gold Cross of the Virtuti Militari
Recipients of the Order of the Cross of Grunwald
Commanders of the Order of Polonia Restituta
Recipients of the Cross of Independence
Recipients of the Cross of Valour (Poland)
Recipients of the Gold Cross of Merit (Poland)
Polish people of the Polish–Soviet War
Polish people of German descent